Semantic architecture is a novel concept in software architecture which envisions enabling the architecture community to unambiguously capture, catalog, communicate, preserve, and interoperably exchange semantics of their architectures, thus making architecture descriptions true assets.

Overview 

The overall goals of the semantic architecture are
 to define a formal semantic way of representing architecture intended to be both human and machine readable
 to describe a system architecture at a high level of abstraction
 to support automatic generation of software architecture models
 to permit analysis of architectural quality attributes
 to provide a repository of patterns expressed utilizing the semantic web standards RDF/S and OWL

In order to achieve these goals, the software architecture community and industry need to define
 a common architecture description language
 an OWL ontology for architecture data models
 a set of tools for capturing, querying, and visualizing all aspects and view points of an architecture

The tooling or toolkits for semantic architecture should
 be suitable for communicating an architecture to all stakeholders
 supports architecture creation, refinement, evaluation, and validation of quality attributes
 provides a basis for further implementation
 allows the architecture community to exchange semantics of architecture styles and patterns in an interoperable fashion

See also
 Software architecture
 Semantic Web
 Ontology-based data integration
 Semantic mapper
 Semantic translation

Ontology (information science)
Semantics
Software architecture